Norfolk and Western 578 is a preserved 4-6-2 "Pacific" type steam locomotive. Built by ALCO's Richmond Works in 1910, No. 578 was assigned to pull premiere passenger trains for the Norfolk and Western Railway before it was downgraded to secondary passenger service. It was retired from revenue service altogether in 1958, and it was subsequently donated to the Ohio Railway Museum in Worthington, Ohio. The Ohio Railway Museum used No. 578 to pull some tourist trains on their trackage, until it was sidelined as a result of mechanical problems in the early 1970s. As of 2023, No. 578 remains on static display next to the Ohio Railway Museum's depot.

History

Revenue service 
In the early 1910s, the Norfolk and Western Railway (N&W) ordered a fleet of 4-6-2 "Pacific" type locomotives from the American Locomotive Company (ALCO) in order to expand their passenger locomotive fleet. Sixteen E2 class 4-6-2s were built at ALCO's former Richmond Locomotive Works plant in Richmond, Virginia in March 1910, being numbered 564-579, and No. 578 was the second-final member of the class. Two years later, in 1912, No. 578, along with the rest of the E2 class locomotives, was modified with superheated flues, and it was reclassified as an E2a.

The N&W initially assigned their fleet of 4-6-2's to pull the railroad's high-priority passenger trains on their mainline throughout Virginia, West Virginia, and Ohio. Between 1917 and 1944, No. 578 was primarily used to pull passenger trains throughout the Scioto Division out of Columbus, Ohio. As time progressed, No. 578 and the rest of the N&W's 4-6-2s were reassigned to pull short-distance passenger trains, as well as communiter trains on branchlines, when the K class 4-8-2 "Mountain" types and J class 4-8-4 "Northerns" were built and assigned to pull the high-priority trains. Towards the end of the 1940s, No. 578's original tender was replaced with a larger tender with the same coal and water capacity as a K1 class 4-8-2.

The locomotive subsequently spent the remainder of its revenue career pulling local passenger trains on the N&W’s Norton Branch between Norton, Virginia and Bluefield, West Virginia alongside some of its remaining classmates. The locomotive completed its final revenue passenger run in December 1958 before it was removed from the N&W's active list.

Preservation 

While the rest of the N&W's fleet of 4-6-2's were sold for scrap, No. 578 was donated to the Central Ohio Railfan Association of Worthington, Ohio in 1959. Upon arrival in Worthington, No. 578 was still in operational condition, so beginning in 1960, the association decided to use the locomotive to pull their own short-distance tourist trains for five times a year. This lasted until 1966, when the locomotive's flue time expired. Volunteers subsequently spent the next four years repairing No. 578's boiler in order to return the locomotive to service. Restoration work was completed in 1970, and the locomotive pulled a few more tourist trains on the now slightly extended line for the Association, which recently changed their name to the Ohio Railway Museum (ORM).

Shortly afterward, however, it was discovered that No. 578 had a broken spring hanger, which was deemed too expensive to repair or replace. A decision was subsequently made to further remove No. 578 from service and keep her as a permanent static display piece. As of 2023, No. 578 remains on static display on ORM's property.

See also 

 Norfolk and Western 433
 Norfolk and Western 475
 Norfolk and Western 611

References 

4-6-2 locomotives
578
ALCO locomotives
Individual locomotives of the United States
Preserved steam locomotives of Ohio
Passenger locomotives
Railway locomotives introduced in 1910
Standard gauge locomotives of the United States